The Belgian Records in Swimming are the fastest times ever swum by a Belgian swimmer. These records are kept by the Royal Belgium Swimming Federation ((Flemish) Koninklijke Belgische Zwembond (KBZB),  Fédération Royale Belge de Natation (FRBN)).

The federation keeps records for both males and females, for long course (50m) and short course (25m) competition. Records are kept in the following events:
freestyle: 50, 100, 200, 400, 800 and 1500;
backstroke: 50, 100 and 200;
breaststroke: 50, 100 and 200;
butterfly: 50, 100 and 200;
individual medley: 100 (25m only), 200 and 400;
relays: 4x50 free (25m only), 4x100 free, 4x200 free, 4x50 medley (25m only) and 4x100 medley.

Long course (50m)

Men

Women

Mixed relay

Short course (25m)

Men

Women

Mixed relay

References
General
Belgian Long Course Records 13 March 2023 updated
Belgian Short Course Records 15 March 2023 updated
Specific

External links
Koninklijke Belgische Zwembond & Federation Royale Belge de Natation web site

Belgium
Records
swimming
Swimming